In the field of Management, Sticky Information is information which is costly to acquire, transfer, and use in a new location.   Eric von Hippel coined the term around 1994. Because of the importance of sticky, local information for some kinds of innovation and product customization, von Hippel suggests that in certain circumstances the innovation will be increasingly accomplished by end-users (user innovation) rather than an expert provider. Toolkits for User Innovation can be used to support end-users in their innovation process.

In the field of Economics, Sticky Information is related to the concept of Sticky Prices.  That is, members of the economy are making decisions with lagged information.  A longer discussion of the term resides under the Stick Information heading of the Nominal Rigidity page.

See also
 Configuration System
 Creativity techniques
 Lead user
 Open Innovation
 Product management
 product differentiation
 Sticky (economics)
 User innovation
 Crowdcasting

References

External links
 Eric Von Hippel's homepage Books and articles in the creative commons licence available.

Innovation
Strategic management
Information systems